Susan Ndalama is a Malawian politician who serves as member of the Malawian Parliament for Blantyre Rural East. Ndalama's term began on 20 May 2014.

References

Living people
21st-century Malawian politicians
Members of the National Assembly (Malawi)
21st-century women politicians
Democratic Progressive Party (Malawi) politicians
Year of birth missing (living people)